A broker is a party that mediates between a buyer and a seller.

Broker may also refer to:


Occupations
 Broker-dealer, a person or organization that engages in trading securities
 Customs broker, one who clears goods through customs for import or export
 Information broker, a person or business finds information on individuals as a commodity
 Information broker, also known as an information consultant, an information professional who provides information as a service
Real estate agent, also known as a real estate broker, person representing sellers or buyers of property

People
 Fred Broker (1893–1971), American National Football League player 
 Gulabdas Broker (1909–2006), Gujarati language author from India
 Ignatia Broker (1919–1987), American Ojibwe writer
 Thomas Bröker (born 1985), German football winger

Software
 Message broker or integration broker, a module that translates a message from the formal messaging protocol of the sender to the formal messaging protocol of the receiver
 Object request broker, middleware that allows programmers to make program calls from one computer to another via a network
 Storage Resource Broker, a data grid middleware software system produced by the San Diego Supercomputer Center
 Tunnel broker, a service provides a network tunnel

Other uses
 The Broker, a novel by John Grisham
 Broker (2010 film), a R. P. Patnaik Telugu film
 Broker (2022 film), a South Korean film directed by Hirokazu Kore-eda
 Broker, Lewis, a small hamlet in the Outer Hebrides of Scotland
 The Power Broker, 1974 biography of Robert Moses

See also
Broker#Types of brokers